Pierre de Bellefeuille, OC (May 12, 1923 – September 30, 2015) was a Canadian politician and a two-term Member of the National Assembly of Quebec.

Background
He was born on May 12, 1923, in Ottawa, Ontario. He became an accountant.

Federal politics
De Bellefeuille ran as a New Democratic Party candidate in the 1972 election in the federal district of Ahuntsic. He finished second against Liberal candidate Jeanne Sauvé.

Member of the National Assembly
He ran as a Parti Québécois candidate in the 1976 election against Liberal incumbent Jean-Paul L'Allier in the provincial district of Deux-Montagnes and won. He served as a parliamentary assistant from 1976 to 1984.

He was re-elected in the 1981 election, but he crossed the floor during the Parti Québécois Crisis of 1984. He sat as an Independent by November 20, 1984, and became the only sitting Member of the Parti indépendantiste.

de Bellefeuille ran for re-election as a candidate of that party in the 1985 election. He finished third.

Footnotes

1923 births
2015 deaths
New Democratic Party candidates for the Canadian House of Commons
Parti Québécois MNAs
Politicians from Ottawa
Quebec candidates for Member of Parliament
Officers of the Order of Canada